Shivaji V (26 December 1830 – 4 August 1866) was Raja of Kolhapur of the Bhonsle dynasty. He ruled from 1838 to 1866. During his reign, he was granted a personal salute of 19 guns with a hereditary salute of 17 guns. He was succeeded by Rajaram II.

Personal life

Shivaji V married twice:

 1. Sundrabai Bhonsle (1835–1866). Married at Kolhapur in 1847 and had two sons:
 1. Yuvraj Shahaji Bhonsle(24 August 1848 – March 1849)
 2. Maharajkumar...(no name) (1855–1857)

 2. Ahilyabai Barodekarin Bhonsle (1842–1895). Daughter of Ganpatrao Gaekwad, Maharaja of Baroda. Married at Baroda 1854 and had one son:
 Maharajkumar...(no name) (1858–1863)

Titles

 1830–1838: Yuvraj Shivaji Bhonsle

 1838 – 24 May 1866: Shivaji III Shahaji Dam Altaphoo, Raja of Kolhapur

 24 May – 4 August 1866: Shivaji III Shahaji Dam Altaphoo, Raja of Kolhapur, KCSI

Honours

 Knight Commander of the Order of the Star of India (KCSI), 1866

References

Sources

People of the Maratha Empire
Knights Commander of the Order of the Star of India
1830 births
1866 deaths
Maharajas of Kolhapur
Indian knights